Lydia Zele is an American taekwondo practitioner.

She won a gold medal at the 1989 World Taekwondo Championships in Seoul, by defeating Denise Parmley in the quarterfinal, Antonia Vega in the semifinal, and Marcia King in the final.

References

External links

Year of birth missing (living people)
Living people
American female taekwondo practitioners
World Taekwondo Championships medalists
20th-century American women